Steven Rance Mulliniks (born January 15, 1956) is an American former Major League Baseball player.

Playing career
He had been traded along with Willie Aikens from the Angels to the Royals for Al Cowens and Todd Cruz at the Winter Meetings in Toronto on December 6, 1979, with Craig Eaton being sent to California to complete the transaction four months later on April 1, 1980.

Mulliniks' luck changed when he was traded to the Toronto Blue Jays, just before the start of the  season. He was converted to third base and appeared in over 100 games each year through the  season. He batted over .300 three times (and ) and demonstrated great patience at the plate, regularly posting on-base percentages near .400. In 1984 Sports Illustrated named him to their "Dream Team" as a utility infielder.

In 1992, Mulliniks' Blue Jays would go on to win the World Series. However, Mulliniks would play just three regular season games for the Blue Jays as he struggled with injuries, and would play no postseason games.

In his career, Mulliniks accrued a .272 batting average over 3569 at bats in 1325 games, with 445 runs, 972 hits, 226 doubles, 17 triples, 73 home runs, 435 RBIs, 15 stolen bases and 460 walks. Personal records from this time period: Highest batting average: .324 ('84); Most games: 129 ('83, '85); Most at bats: 366 ('85); Most runs: 55 ('85); Most hits: 111 ('84); Most doubles: 34 ('83); Most triples: 5 ('84); Most home runs: 12 ('88); Most RBIs: 57 ('85); Most stolen bases: 3 ('82), Most walks: 57 ('83).

Retirement and broadcasting career

Mulliniks retired after the  season having compiled a .272 career batting average, 73 home runs, 435 RBI, and 445 runs. He holds the Blue Jays franchise single season fielding percentage record for third basemen (.975) and the franchise record for most pinch hits (59).

Mulliniks has been a colour commentator for Blue Jays coverage on Rogers Sportsnet, and alongside Jim Hughson and Jesse Barfield on CBC Sports in 2007 and 2008. In 2009, Mulliniks filled in for Jerry Remy for Boston Red Sox coverage on NESN, for the Red Sox May 29–31 road trip to Toronto.

Mulliniks is now a real estate agent in Visalia, CA. He coached at College of the Sequoias and operated Mulliniks Baseball School.

References

External links 
 Rance Mulliniks' career statistics at Baseball-Reference.com

1956 births
Living people
People from Tulare, California
California Angels players
Canadian television sportscasters
Kansas City Royals players
Major League Baseball broadcasters
Major League Baseball infielders
Baseball players from California
Major League Baseball third basemen
Toronto Blue Jays announcers
Toronto Blue Jays players
American expatriate baseball players in Canada